Patrick Obrist (born 27 February 1993) is an Austrian professional ice hockey forward currently playing for EHC Kloten of the National League (NL) and the Austria men's national ice hockey team.

He represented Austria at the 2019 IIHF World Championship.

References

External links

1993 births
Living people
Austrian expatriate ice hockey people
Austrian expatriate sportspeople in Switzerland
Austrian ice hockey forwards
EC Red Bull Salzburg players
EHC Kloten players
People from Dornbirn
SC Rapperswil-Jona Lakers players
Sportspeople from Vorarlberg